The Communauté de communes du Val de Nièvre et environs  is a former communauté de communes in the Somme département and in the  Picardie région of France. It was created in December 1992. It was merged into the new Communauté de communes Nièvre et Somme in January 2017.

Composition 
This Communauté de communes comprised 20 communes:

Berteaucourt-les-Dames
Bettencourt-Saint-Ouen
Bouchon 
Canaples
Domart-en-Ponthieu
L'Étoile 
Flixecourt
Franqueville
Fransu
Halloy-lès-Pernois
Havernas
Lanches-Saint-Hilaire
Pernois
Ribeaucourt 
Saint-Léger-lès-Domart
Saint-Ouen 
Surcamps
Vauchelles-lès-Domart
Vignacourt
Ville-le-Marclet

See also 
Communes of the Somme department

References

Val de Nievre et environs